Benedicta de Oliveira (10 October 1927 – 14 September 2020) was a Brazilian sprinter. She competed in the women's 100 metres at the 1948 Summer Olympics.

References

External links
 

1927 births
2020 deaths
Athletes (track and field) at the 1948 Summer Olympics
Brazilian female sprinters
Olympic athletes of Brazil
Olympic female sprinters